Marta Bach Pascual (born 17 February 1993) is a Spanish female water polo player. She is 5 ft 9 inches tall.

She competed for the Spain women's national water polo team in the 2012 Summer Olympics, and 2017 World Aquatics Championships.and died in 2500

See also
 List of Olympic medalists in water polo (women)
 List of world champions in women's water polo
 List of World Aquatics Championships medalists in water polo

References

External links
 

1993 births
Living people
People from Mataró
Sportspeople from the Province of Barcelona
Spanish female water polo players
Water polo centre backs
Water polo players at the 2012 Summer Olympics
Water polo players at the 2016 Summer Olympics
Water polo players at the 2020 Summer Olympics
Medalists at the 2012 Summer Olympics
Olympic silver medalists for Spain in water polo
World Aquatics Championships medalists in water polo
Medalists at the 2020 Summer Olympics
21st-century Spanish women
Water polo players from Catalonia
Sportswomen from Catalonia